Portugal competed at the 2011 World Aquatics Championships in Shanghai, China between July 16 and 31, 2011.

Open water swimming

Men

Swimming

Portugal qualified 7 swimmers.

Men

Women

References

Nations at the 2011 World Aquatics Championships
2011 in Portuguese sport
Portugal at the World Aquatics Championships